Nur Luqman (born 20 June 1998) is a Singaporean footballer currently playing as a midfielder for Geylang International.

Club career
Nur Luqman was signed by Geylang International in 2020 after an impressive season in 2019 with the Young Lions FC.

Career statistics

Club

Notes

International career

Nur Luqman was selected for the 2019 SEA Games squad and played in the match against Vietnam.

References

Living people
1998 births
Singaporean footballers
Association football midfielders
Singapore Premier League players